Mosla is a genus of plants in the family Lamiaceae, first described as a genus in 1875. It is native to eastern Asia, the Himalayas, and southeastern Asia.

Species
 Mosla bracteata Doan ex Suddee & A.J.Paton - Vietnam
 Mosla cavaleriei H.Lév.- Vietnam, Guangdong, Guangxi, Guizhou, Hubei, Jiangxi, Sichuan, Yunnan, Zhejiang 
 Mosla chinensis Maxim. - Vietnam, Korea, Japan, Anhui, Fujian, Guangdong, Guangxi, Guizhou, Hubei, Hunan, Jiangsu, Jiangxi, Shandong, Sichuan, Taiwan, Zhejiang 
 Mosla coreana H.Lév. - Korea
 Mosla dianthera (Buch.-Ham. ex Roxb.) Maxim. - China, Japan, Korea, Ryukyu Islands, Kuril Islands, Primorye, Caucasus, Himalayas (Nepal, Bangladesh, Bhutan, northern + eastern India), Myanmar, Vietnam, Philippines, Sumatra
 Mosla exfoliata (C.Y.Wu) C.Y.Wu & H.W.Li - Sichuan
 Mosla hangchouensis Matsuda - Zhejiang
 Mosla japonica (Benth. ex Oliv.) Maxim. - Japan, Korea, Ryukyu Islands
 Mosla longibracteata (C.Y.Wu & S.J.Hsuan) C.Y.Wu & H.W.Li - Guangxi, Zhejiang
 Mosla longispica (C.Y.Wu) C.Y.Wu & H.W.Li - Jiangxi
 Mosla pauciflora (C.Y.Wu) C.Y.Wu & H.W.Li - Guizhou, Hubei, Sichuan
 Mosla punctulata Nakai - Korea, Taiwan, Japan, China
 Mosla scabra (Thunb.) C.Y.Wu & H.W.Li -  Vietnam, Korea, Japan, Ryukyu Islands, Anhui, Fujian, Gansu, Guangdong, Guangxi, Henan, Hubei, Hunan, Jiangsu, Jiangxi, Liaoning, Shaanxi, Sichuan, Taiwan, Zhejiang 
 Mosla soochouensis Matsuda - Anhui, Jiangsu, Jiangxi, Zhejiang
 Mosla tamdaoensis Phuong - Vietnam

References

Lamiaceae
Lamiaceae genera